Federal Medical Centre, Lokoja is a federal government of Nigeria medical centre located in Lokoja, Kogi State, Nigeria. The current chief medical director is Olatunde Alabi.

History 
Federal Medical Centre, Lokoja was established in 1999. The hospital was formerly known as General Hospital, Lokoja.

CMD 
The current chief medical director is Olatunde Alabi.

References 

Hospitals in Nigeria